Feriköy is a neighbourhood of Şişli, Istanbul, Turkey. It is home to two large adjoining cemeteries, one for Roman Catholic burials, the other for Protestant ones. It adjoins fashionable Bomonti, with its towering hotel blocks.

See also 
 Feriköy S.K.
 Feriköy Protestant Cemetery
 Feriköy Cemetery

References

Neighbourhoods of Şişli